Iain David Johnston (born 1965) is a United States district judge of the United States District Court for the Northern District of Illinois and a former United States magistrate judge of the same court.

Education 

Johnston earned his Bachelor of Science, cum laude, from Rockford University in 1987 and his Juris Doctor, cum laude, from UIC John Marshall Law School in 1990.

Career 

Johnston served as a law clerk to Judge Philip Godfrey Reinhard of the Illinois Second District Appellate Court and then the United States District Court for the Northern District of Illinois. He was a unit supervisor for the Office of the Illinois Attorney General and in private practice at Altheimer & Gray, Holland & Knight, and Johnston Greene. He also serves as an adjunct professor at UIC John Marshall Law School.

Federal judicial service 

Johnston served as a United States magistrate judge of the United States District Court for the Northern District of Illinois, a position he was appointed to on May 3, 2013, and left in 2020 upon becoming a district judge.

On February 5, 2020, President Donald Trump announced his intent to nominate Johnston to serve as a United States district judge of the United States District Court for the Northern District of Illinois. On February 12, 2020, his nomination was sent to the Senate. President Trump nominated Johnston to the seat vacated by Judge Frederick J. Kapala, who assumed senior status on May 10, 2019. A hearing on his nomination before the Senate Judiciary Committee was held on June 24, 2020. On July 30, 2020, his nomination was reported out of committee by a 17–5 vote. On September 16, 2020, the United States Senate voted 81–15 to invoke cloture on his nomination. On September 17, 2020, his nomination was confirmed by a 77–14 vote. He received his judicial commission on September 23, 2020.

Membership 

He was a member of the Federalist Society from 1995 to 1998.

References

External links 
 

1965 births
Living people
20th-century American lawyers
21st-century American lawyers
21st-century American judges
Federalist Society members
Illinois lawyers
John Marshall Law School (Chicago) alumni
John Marshall Law School (Chicago) faculty
Judges of the United States District Court for the Northern District of Illinois
Lawyers from Chicago
Rockford University alumni
United States magistrate judges
United States district court judges appointed by Donald Trump